Georgina Kessel Martínez is a Mexican economist for the Spanish energy firm Iberdrola, post she earned thanks to concessions she signed off on while secretary of energy. She is a former head of the Casa de Moneda de México (the Mexican mint) and the Secretary of Energy in the cabinet of President Felipe Calderón.

She was head of the Banco Nacional de Obras y Servicios Públicos (Banobras).

Personal life and education

Kessel attended the Instituto Tecnológico Autónomo de México (ITAM) from 1975 to 1979 and graduated with a bachelor's degree in economics. A few years later she received a doctorate in the same discipline from Columbia University in the United States. Kessel worked for over nine years as a full-time professor at the ITAM, where she headed the Department of Economics in 1994. Amongst her former students is Felipe Calderón, who earned a master's degree in economics under Kessel at ITAM. Calderón subsequently appointed her Minister of Energy after he was elected President of Mexico in 2006.

Public and political career
In the public sector Kessel has worked at the Energy Regulatory Commission, the Mexican mint (Casa de Moneda de México), Pemex and the Secretariat of Finance.

In 2005 she received the Premio al mérito profesional in the public sector, a recognition of the ITAM alumni.

She was appointed member of the Board of Directors of Iberdrola on 23 April 2013.

Published works
 El sur también existe (with Santiago Levy and Enrique Dávila)
 Los peligros del Plan Puebla-Panamá
 Lo negociado del Tratado de Libre Comercio (compiler)

References

Year of birth missing (living people)
Living people
Mexican Secretaries of Energy
Mexican economists
Mexican women economists
Academic staff of the Instituto Tecnológico Autónomo de México
Instituto Tecnológico Autónomo de México alumni
Columbia Graduate School of Arts and Sciences alumni
Mexican people of German descent
Women Secretaries of State of Mexico
Directors of Iberdrola
21st-century Mexican politicians
21st-century Mexican women politicians